Lars Edi Stindl (born 26 August 1988) is a German professional footballer who plays as an attacking midfielder for and captains Bundesliga club Borussia Mönchengladbach. He represents the Germany national team. He can also play as a forward. He scored the only goal in the final of 2017 FIFA Confederations Cup against Chile to ensure Germany's first ever title.

Club career

Born in Speyer, Stindl began his career in the youth teams for TSV Wiesental and joined a similar setup at Karlsruher SC in summer 2000. He started his professional career with Karlsruher SC, making his first appearance on 15 March 2008 in the Bundesliga. He was substituted on in the 81st minute in a 0–1 defeat to Eintracht Frankfurt. On 29 November 2008, Stindl scored his first Bundesliga goal against Hannover 96. In February 2010, he announced his intention to leave Karlsruher SC. On 16 March 2010, his transfer to Hannover 96 was confirmed.

On 25 March 2015 it was confirmed that Stindl would move to Borussia Mönchengladbach for the 2015–16 season.

On 8 August 2015, he marked his competitive debut by scoring a brace in a 4–1 win at FC St. Pauli in the first round of the 2015–16 DFB-Pokal.

Stindl was confirmed as Gladbach's new captain on 1 August 2016 after the retirement of previous captain Martin Stranzl and the transfer of vice-captain Granit Xhaka to Arsenal.

On 23 February 2017, Stindl scored a hat-trick at ACF Fiorentina's Stadio Artemio Franchi, as Borussia overturned a 0–3 aggregate deficit to qualify for the UEFA Europa League Round of 16.

On 15 December 2020, Stindl scored a hat-trick against Eintracht Frankfurt in the Bundesliga. Two of the goals came after the 90th minute.

International career

Youth
Stindl is a former Germany U20 international and has won one cap for the Germany U21.

Senior

Stindl was first called up to the senior national team in 2017, for the friendly against Denmark on 6 June 2017, for the 2018 World Cup qualification match against San Marino on 10 June 2017 and for the 2017 Confederations Cup to be held from 17 June to 2 July 2017.

Stindl made his international debut on 6 June against Denmark, where he started for the game and played the full 90 minutes.

In the opening game of the 2017 FIFA Confederations Cup against Australia, Stindl scored his first goal for Germany in the fifth minute of the match. He followed this up with his second international goal in Germany's 1–1 draw with Chile three days later. He repeated the feat against the same opposition in the Final of the tournament, scoring the only goal of the match to help Germany claim the title, finishing as joint top goalscorer with three goals.

On 14 November 2017 he scored a vital equaliser in the 90th minute of a friendly against France (which was the last friendly match of Germany in that year and Germans were lagging behind by 1–2), which ensured Germany's unbeaten streak remaining alive in 2017.

Career statistics

Club

1.Includes DFB-Pokal
2.Includes UEFA Champions League and UEFA Europa League

International

 Germany score listed first, score column indicates score after each Stindl goal.

Honours
Germany
FIFA Confederations Cup: 2017

Individual
FIFA Confederations Cup Silver Boot: 2017
Bundesliga Player of the Month: December 2020

References

External links

German footballers
1988 births
Living people
People from Speyer
Karlsruher SC players
Karlsruher SC II players
Hannover 96 players
Borussia Mönchengladbach players
Association football midfielders
Germany youth international footballers
Germany under-21 international footballers
Germany international footballers
Bundesliga players
2. Bundesliga players
Regionalliga players
2017 FIFA Confederations Cup players
FIFA Confederations Cup-winning players
Footballers from Rhineland-Palatinate